Head Home is the second album and label debut from Brooklyn based gothic country band O'Death. The album was self-released in 2006, and remastered and re-released in 2007 when the band signed to the Ernest Jenning Record Co. label.

Track listing

Personnel
Greg Jamie - vocals, guitar
Gabe Darling - ukulele, slide guitar, banjo, vocals
David Rogers-Berry - drums, vocals
Bob Pycior - fiddle, percussion
Jesse Newman - bass, vocals, accordion
Dan Sager - euphonium, percussion

References

2007 albums
O'Death albums